In algebra and in particular in algebraic combinatorics, a quasisymmetric function is any element in the ring of quasisymmetric functions which is in turn a subring of the formal power series ring with a countable number of variables.  This ring generalizes  the ring of symmetric functions.  This ring can be realized as a specific limit of the rings of quasisymmetric polynomials in n variables, as n goes to infinity. This ring serves as universal structure in which relations between quasisymmetric polynomials can be expressed in a way independent of the number n of variables (but its elements are neither polynomials nor functions).

Definitions 

The ring of quasisymmetric functions, denoted QSym, can be defined over any commutative ring R such as the  integers. 
Quasisymmetric 
functions are power series of bounded degree in variables  with coefficients in R, which are shift invariant in the sense that the coefficient of  the monomial  is equal to the coefficient of the monomial  for any strictly increasing sequence of positive integers 
 indexing the variables and any positive integer sequence  of exponents.
Much of the study of quasisymmetric functions is based on that of symmetric functions.

A quasisymmetric function in finitely many variables is a quasisymmetric polynomial.
Both symmetric and quasisymmetric polynomials may be characterized in terms of actions of the symmetric group 
on a polynomial ring in  variables . 
One such action of  permutes variables,
changing a polynomial  by iteratively swapping pairs 
of variables having consecutive indices.
Those polynomials unchanged by all such swaps
form the subring of symmetric polynomials.
A second action of  conditionally permutes variables, 
changing a polynomial 
by swapping pairs  of variables
except in monomials containing both variables.
Those polynomials unchanged by all such conditional swaps form
the subring of quasisymmetric polynomials.  One quasisymmetric function in four variables  is the polynomial

 

The simplest symmetric function containing these monomials is

Important bases 

QSym is a graded R-algebra, decomposing as 

 

where  is the -span of all quasisymmetric functions that are homogeneous of degree .

 

The fundamental basis consists  and all formal power series 

 

Thus, when the ring  is the ring of rational numbers, one has

 

Then one can define the algebra of symmetric functions  as the subalgebra of QSym spanned by the monomial symmetric functions  and all formal power series  where the sum is over all compositions  which rearrange to the partition .  Moreover, we have .  For example,  and 

Other important bases for quasisymmetric functions include the basis of quasisymmetric Schur functions, the "type I" and "type II" quasisymmetric power sums, and bases related to enumeration in matroids.

Applications 

Quasisymmetric functions have been applied in enumerative combinatorics, symmetric function theory, representation theory, and number theory.  Applications of
quasisymmetric functions include enumeration of P-partitions,
permutations, tableaux, chains of posets, reduced decompositions in finite Coxeter groups (via Stanley symmetric functions), and parking functions. In symmetric function theory and representation theory, applications include the study of Schubert polynomials, Macdonald polynomials,
Hecke algebras, and Kazhdan–Lusztig polynomials. Often quasisymmetric functions provide a powerful bridge between combinatorial structures and symmetric functions.

Related algebras 

As a graded Hopf algebra, the dual of the ring of quasisymmetric functions is the ring of noncommutative symmetric functions. 
Every symmetric function is also a quasisymmetric function, and hence the ring of symmetric functions is a subalgebra of the ring of quasisymmetric functions.

The ring of quasisymmetric functions is the terminal object in category of graded Hopf algebras with a single character.
Hence any such Hopf algebra has a morphism to the ring of quasisymmetric functions.

One example of this is the peak algebra.

Other related algebras 
The Malvenuto–Reutenauer algebra is a Hopf algebra based on permutations that relates the rings of symmetric functions, quasisymmetric functions, and noncommutative symmetric functions, (denoted Sym, QSym, and NSym respectively), as depicted the following commutative diagram.  The duality between QSym and NSym mentioned above is reflected in the main diagonal of this diagram.

Many related Hopf algebras were constructed from Hopf monoids in the category of species by Aguiar and Majahan.

One can also construct the ring of quasisymmetric functions in noncommuting variables.

References

External links
BIRS Workshop on Quasisymmetric Functions

Algebraic combinatorics
Types of functions
Polynomials

Ring theory
Hopf algebras